This is a list of edge cities by continent, country and metropolitan area.

Definition
An edge city is a term coined by Joel Garreau's in his 1991 book Edge City: Life on the New Frontier, for a place in a metropolitan area, outside cities' original downtowns (thus, in the suburbs or, if within the city limits of the central city, an area of suburban density), with a large concentration of jobs, office space, and retail space. Originally, Garreau defined edge cities in the North American context, though he gave some examples outside North America. To qualify under Garreau's rules, an edge city:
 has five million or more square feet (465,000 m2) of leasable office space
 has 600,000 square feet (56,000 m2) or more of leasable retail space
 has more jobs than bedrooms
 is perceived by the population as one place
 was nothing like a "city" as recently as 30 years ago. As Garreau stated, "[then] it was just bedrooms, if not cow pastures."

List by country and metropolitan area
This list is incomplete. You can help by expanding it with entries that meet the criteria and that reference a reliable source.
Note: "Emerging 1991" indicated that Garreau assessed this area as an emerging edge city in his 1991 book.

Canada

Montreal
Laval

Toronto
Brampton
Mississauga
Markham
Vaughan Metropolitan Centre

Chile

Santiago
Providencia (Providencia, Chile)

France

Paris
La Défense
Noisy-le-Grand

Korea (South)

Seoul
Bundang
Ilsan

Mexico

Monterrey
San Pedro Garza García
San Nicolás de los Garza

Guadalajara
Zapopan

Mexico City
Interlomas
Santa Fe

Tijuana

Turkey

Istanbul

The historic city center is in Fatih and contains historic sites, the Grand Bazaar and adjacent wholesale/retail districts, but is not a modern "central business district" in that it does not have modern retail formats, dense residential and hotel towers, etc. These can be found in the following edge cities with concentrations of office space, malls, residential towers, entertainment and educational facilities, hospitals, etc.:
Taksim-Beyoğlu: Taksim Square in Beyoğlu to Nişantaşı in Şişli
The Istanbul Central Business District as the real estate industry refers to it, which is not the historic city center, but is a 7-km-long north-south corridor of modern areas along Barbaros Boulevard and Büyükdere Avenue. Metro Line 2 runs along part of it. From south to north, the areas in the corridor are:
in Beşiktaş district: 
Balmumcu
Gayrettepe incl. Profilo, Astoria and Trump Towers (Trump Alışveriş Merkezi) complexes
Etiler including Boğaziçi University
in Şişli district: 
Fulya, Otim and the core Şişli neighborhood incl. the İstanbul Cevahir complex
Esentepe including Zincirlikuyu and the Zorlu Center complex
Levent including the Metrocity, Özdilekpark and Istanbul Sapphire complexes
in Sarıyer district:
Maslak including the İstinye Park complex and the Istanbul Technical University
the Vadistanbul mall and office complexes in Ayazağa
Istanbul Atatürk Airport area: strip development along the O-7 highway north to the Mall of Istanbul, Bahçelievler district
Asian side:
Kozyatagi in Kadıköy district incl. Palladium complex
Altunizade in Üsküdar district, site of the Capitol Shopping Center
Kavacık in Beykoz district
Ümraniye district incl. the Akyaka Park, Oryapark and Canpark complexes

United Kingdom

London
Canary Wharf
Croydon

United States

Atlanta
Airport area (incl. parts of College Park/Hapeville/East Point, emerging 1991)
Brookhaven I-85 and Buford Highway corridors incl. Lenox Park, Century Center, Executive Park, Corporate Square, Northeast Plaza
Buckhead
Cumberland (Cumberland Mall/Cobb Galleria Centre area near I-285/I-75) – home to Cobb Energy Performing Arts Centre and Truist Park
Gwinnett Place/Sugarloaf business districts along I-85, near interchange with SR 316 (emerging 1991)
Johns Creek Technology Park
Midtown Atlanta (emerging 1991)
Perimeter Center (I-285 and Georgia 400, emerging 1991)

Austin
The Domain-Northwest area
Highland area
South Round Rock

Baltimore
Arundel Mills area
Baltimore-Washington Airport area
Columbia
Hanover, Maryland
Hunt Valley
Owings Mills
Security Boulevard
Towson
White Marsh

Birmingham
Brookwood Village area
Inverness (Hwy 280/I-459 interchange area, incl. The Summit)
Hoover (Riverchase area near Hwy 31/I-459)

Boston
Alewife T Station area
Braintree Split area
Burlington Mall area
Foxborough
Framingham/Natick area
Massachusetts Turnpike and I-495
Massachusetts Turnpike and Route 128
Route 128 and Interstate 93
Nashua, New Hampshire
Peabody-Danvers
Salem, New Hampshire

Charlotte
SouthPark
University City
Concord
Ballantyne

Chicago
Illinois Technology and Research Corridor incl. parts of Oak Brook, Lisle, Naperville, Aurora along the East-West Tollway, Oakbrook Terrace, Lombard
I-94 "Lake Shore Corridor": including parts of Skokie, Northbrook, Deerfield, Buffalo Grove Lincolnshire, Vernon Hills, Lake Forest
Golden Corridor/Northwest Corridor incl. O'Hare Airport and Schaumburg areas including parts of Rosemont, Arlington Heights, Rolling Meadows, Hoffman Estates and Woodfield Mall area near the Northwest Tollway, Elgin, Itasca

Cleveland
Chagrin Boulevard and Interstate 271 area (Beachwood)
Rockside Road and Interstate 77 area (Independence) - emerging 1991

Denver 

 Greenwood Village - Denver Tech Ctr

Detroit 

 Ann Arbor–Briarwood Mall area
 Southfield Town Center Complex
 Troy–Big Beaver Road area

Kansas City
College Boulevard–Overland Park area
Country Club Plaza area
Crown Center area
Kansas City International Airport area

Greater Los Angeles
Central Los Angeles and Westside
Beverly Hills/Century City
LAX/El Segundo
Marina Del Rey/Culver City
Mid-Wilshire
Miracle Mile
West Los Angeles
San Fernando Valley
Burbank/North Hollywood
Sherman Oaks/Van Nuys, Los Angeles
Warner Center, Los Angeles/West Valley
Elsewhere in Los Angeles County
Pasadena
South Bay/Torrance/Carson
South Valley/Covina (emerging 1991)
Valencia (emerging 1991)
Orange County
Anaheim–Santa Ana edge city
Fullerton/La Habra/Brea (emerging 1991)
Irvine Spectrum
Newport Center/Fashion Island (emerging 1991)
San Clemente/Laguna Niguel (emerging 1991)
South Coast Plaza–John Wayne Airport edge city
Westminster/Huntington Beach
Other counties
Ontario Airport/Rancho Cucamonga
Riverside (emerging 1991)
San Bernardino (emerging 1991)
Ventura/Coastal Plain (emerging 1991)

Miami/Fort Lauderdale/West Palm Beach
Aventura
Boca Raton
Coral Gables
Coral Springs
Corporate Park at Cypress Creek area/Oakland Park
Dadeland
Deerfield Beach
Delray Beach
Doral
Flagami area/Miami International Airport area
Hallandale Beach
Hollywood
Palm Beach Gardens/The Gardens Mall area
Pembroke Pines
Pompano Beach
Sunrise/Sawgrass Mills area
Wilton Manors

Minneapolis
Bloomington (southern I-494 west of the airport)
Golden Valley
St. Louis Park

Nashville
Franklin

New York City
New York State
Nassau Co., Long Island: Great Neck-Lake Success-North Shore, Mitchell Field-Garden City
Suffolk Co., Long Island: Hauppauge, New York State Route 110-Melville, 
Westchester Co.: White Plains area, Purchase/Rye, Tarrytown (emerging 1991)
 
Connecticut

Stamford–Greenwich
Westport and I-95 North area
New Jersey
Bergen Co.: Fort Lee, Paramus–Montvale, Mahwah
Hudson Co.: Meadowlands–Hoboken, Newark International Airport–Jersey City (emerging 1991)
Middlesex Co.: Woodbridge area, Metropark station area
Mercer Co.: U.S. 1–Princeton
Morris Co.: Whippany–Parsippany–Troy Hills (287/80 area), Morristown (emerging 1991)
Bridgewater Commons 287/78 area (Bridgewater/Somerville)

Philadelphia
Lower Bucks County, Pennsylvania
Willow Grove
Horsham/Ft. Washington
Plymouth Meeting
Conshohocken
King of Prussia
U.S. Route 202 Corridor around Malvern
West Chester/Exton
Upper Main Line
Bala Cynwyd
Delaware County
Cherry Hill, New Jersey

Raleigh/Durham (Research Triangle)
Research Triangle Park

Sacramento
Arden Fair Mall-California State Fair area (emerging 1991)
Natomas area between downtown and airport (emerging 1991)

San Diego
Mission Valley
Kearny Mesa
"North City" edge city: University City a.k.a. UTC, eastern edge of La Jolla, Sorrento Mesa/Sorrento Valley, Torrey Pines, Del Mar Heights/Carmel Valley
North Coast area (Encinitas to Oceanside along I-5)
I-15 north area (Miramar Naval Air Station to Escondido), incl. the Carmel Mountain Ranch/Rancho Bernardo area, which has more than 6 million sq. ft. of office space, the 5th-largest submarket in the metro area.

San Francisco Bay Area 
East:
Berkeley including Emeryville (emerging 1991)
Concord
Contra Costa Centre/Pleasant Hill BART station area (emerging 1991)
Walnut Creek
Danville-Bishop Ranch-San Ramon
Dublin-Hacienda-Pleasanton-Livermore
South:
Daly City-northern San Mateo County area (emerging 1991)
San Francisco International Airport area in and near South San Francisco
Redwood City-northern San Mateo County area (emerging 1991)
Silicon Valley: San Jose-Cupertino-Santa Clara-Sunnyvale-Mountain View-Palo Alto
San Juan

• Bayamón

• Caguas

• Carolina

• Cataño

• Guaynabo

St. Louis
Clayton
Westport Plaza area
Highway 40-Chesterfield Village area (emerging 1991)

Tampa/St Petersburg
Gateway area, St. Petersburg/Pinellas Park
Westshore/Airport area, Tampa
I-75 area (Brandon, Riverview) (emerging 1991)
Uptown/University of South Florida area 
Wesley Chapel

Washington, DC
in Howard County, Maryland:
part of Columbia

in Montgomery County, Maryland:
Bethesda-Chevy Chase-Upper Wisconsin Avenue NW, D.C.
Democracy Blvd.-North Bethesda-White Flint Mall area (I-270/Beltway)
Gaithersburg-Germantown-I-270
Rockville-I-270
Shady Grove
Silver Spring
Wheaton

in Prince George's County, Maryland
 Lanham-Landover-Largo (Beltway and U.S. Route 50 east around New Carrollton station)
Laurel–I-95 north (emerging 1991)
Bowie New Town (emerging 1991)
National Harbor/PortAmerica–Southern I-95 (emerging 1991)

in Arlington County, Virginia:
Rosslyn-Ballston
Crystal City

in Alexandria, Virginia:
Old Town Alexandria
I-395 corridor (emerging 1991)
Eisenhower Valley area (emerging 1991)

in Fairfax County, Virginia:
Tysons, formerly Tysons Corner
Dulles Technology Corridor: parts of Reston, Herndon and Dulles including the Dulles Airport-Route 28 area
Fairfax Centre-Fair Oaks Mall area (I-66/Route 50)
Merrifield (Beltway/Route 50 West)

Emerging edge cities in Virginia, as of 1991:
Greater Leesburg–Route 7 area, Loudoun County
Gainesville, Prince William County

References

Urbanization
Edge
Edge cities